Nikon D3300 is a 24.2-megapixel DX format DSLR Nikon F-mount camera officially launched by Nikon on 7 January 2014. It was marketed as an entry-level DSLR camera for beginners (offering tutorial- and improved guide-mode) and experienced DSLR hobbyist who were ready for more advanced specs and performance. It replaced the D3200 as Nikon's entry level DSLR. The D3300 usually came with an 18-55mm VR II kit lens, which is the upgraded model of older VR (Vibration Reduction) lens. The new kit lens has the ability to retract its barrel, shortening it for easy storage. 

The Expeed 4 image-processing engine enables the camera to capture 60 fps 1080p video in MPEG-4 format. And 24.2 megapixel images without optical low-pass filter (OLPF, anti-aliasing (AA) filter) at 5 fps as the fastest for low-entry DSLR. It was Nikon's first DSLR camera with Easy (sweep) Panorama. As in the Nikon D5300, the carbon-fiber-reinforced polymer body and also the new retractable kit lens made it smaller and lighter. The camera body is approx. 124 x 98 x 75.5 mm and weighs 460 g with and 410 g without battery and memory card.

In April 2014, the D3300 received a Technical Image Press Association (TIPA) award in the category "Best Digital SLR Entry Level".

The D3300 was superseded as Nikon's entry-level camera by the D3400 in late 2016.

New features
 24.2 megapixel image sensor with 12-bit color depth. Optical low-pass filter removed (OLPF, anti-aliasing (AA) filter) at 5 Frames per second
 Expeed 4 with 1080p video in 60p/50p fps
 New viewfinder with 0.85 magnification
 Panorama mode (Nikon's first DSLR)
 13 special effects
 New auto flash modes
 Tutorial mode and new, improved guide mode
 Carbon-fiber-reinforced polymer, smaller and lighter body
 EN-EL14a and EN-EL14 batteries with enhanced battery life of 700 shots, also due to the new Expeed 4 processor
 Wi-Fi is an optional extra via the WU-1a adapter, which slides into the left side of the camera
 3.5mm mic port

Trivia
 In the 2016 animated film A Silent Voice, the character Yuzuru Nishimiya, uses a Nikon D3300 equipped with a Nikkor 55-250mm F3.5-5.6 VR.

See also
 List of Nikon F-mount lenses with integrated autofocus motor – the D3300 lacks an autofocus motor, but includes an electronic rangefinder. Therefore, the D3300 can only autofocus with lenses with integrated autofocus motors (currently 162).

References

External links

 

D3300
D3300
Cameras introduced in 2014
Live-preview digital cameras